Fr. Acacio Valbuena Rodríguez (8 May 1922 – 4 May 2011) was the Roman Catholic Prefect for Western Sahara. He was ordained as priest in the Oblates of Mary Immaculate on 17 March 1945, and on July 10, 1994, John Paul II installed him in the Apostolic Prefecture of Western Sahara. Rodríguez had an audience with Pope Benedict XVI in Rome on 8 June 2007. Fr. Rodríguez has also attended the Assembly of the Conference of Bishops of North Africa. He lived in El Aaiún. On 25 February 2009, Pope Benedict XVI accepted the resignation of Fr. Rodríguez as Apostolic prefect of Western Sahara for age reasons.

References

1922 births
2011 deaths
Catholic Church in Western Sahara
Spanish expatriates in Western Sahara
20th-century Spanish Roman Catholic priests
People from Laayoune
Missionary Oblates of Mary Immaculate